The Morropón Province is one of eight provinces of the Piura Region in Peru. The province was created in 1936. Its administrative center is in the town of Chulucanas.

Boundaries 
North Ayabaca Province
East Huancabamba Province
South Lambayeque Region
West Piura Province

Political division 
The province is divided into ten districts, which are:

Chulucanas
Buenos Aires
Chalaco
La Matanza
Morropón
Salitral
San Juan de Bigote
Santa Catalina de Mossa
Santo Domingo
Yamango

Geography 
The territory of the province is divided into two by the Piura River. It has many medicinal lagoons that are located on the Cerro Negro,  from the Chalaco District, also close to the village of Inapampa, which contains a natural viewpoint.

On the other side is located the famous dance of tondero, which originates from colonial days and that gives the province of Morropon the recognition of being "The Capital of Tondero".

Weather 
This province is located in the center of the Piura Region, being a land of contrast and climatic fusion. It is dotted by tropical forests of the dry-equatorial style in its flat areas were the carob tree predominates. In high areas of an elevation  the landscape changes to smooth high jungle and a lack of varied hilly valleys.

Its climate is dry-tropical in lower areas. In the winter the temperatures range from 17 °C and 27 C°. The summers are more humid and receive strong temperatures that can exceed 38 C° in the months of January, February, and March. In the high valleys located at an elevation between 1,500-2,000 m the temperatures and the weather is more humid and tropical and the style of high jungle but they maintain less than the summer. The part of the Canchaque mountain range and district of Yamango are temperate and they stay around the 23-24 °C all year although it can lower to 15 °C at nights.

Morropon is known for its extraordinary lemons which may be very well the most juicy in the world; there is located the lemon trees of South America brought by the Spanish. The criollo mango of the dry-tropical is also a large export.

See also 
Piura Region
Perú

References

External links 
  Official website of the Morropón Province

Provinces of the Piura Region